The Spilosomina are a subtribe of tiger moths in the tribe Arctiini, which is part of the family Erebidae.

Taxonomy
The subtribe was previously classified as the tribe Spilosomini of the family Arctiidae.

Genera
The following genera are included in the subtribe.  Numerous arctiine genera have not yet been assigned to a tribe, so this genus list may be incomplete.

Aethalida
Acantharctia
Afraloa
Afroarctia
Afrojavanica
Afromurzinia
Afrospilarctia
Afrowatsonius
Alexicles
Allanwatsonia
Alpenus
Aloa
Alphaea with two subgenera: Flavalphaea and Nayaca
Amsacta
Amsactarctia
Amsactoides
Andala
Arachnis
Ardices with a subgenus Australemyra
Areas with a subgenus Melanareas
Argyarctia with a subgenus Fangalphaea
Binna
Bucaea
Canararctia
Carcinarctia
Cheliosea
Chionarctia
Cladarctia
Creataloum
Creatonotos with a subgenus Phissama
Cymaroa
Dasyarctia
Defreinarctia
Detoulgoetia
Diaphora
Dionychoscelis
Disparctia
Dubatolovia
Eospilarctia with a subgenus Pareospilarctia
Epatolmis
Epilacydes
Estigmene
Eudiaphora
Eyralpenus with a subgenus Pareyralpenus
Fangarctia
Fodinoidea
Heliozona: position is questionable
Hollowaya
Hollowayana
Hyarias
Hypercompe
Hyphantria
Juxtarctia
Kenyarctia
Kiriakoffalia
Lemyra with a subgenus Thyrgorina
Leptarctia
Leucaloa
Lithosarctia with a subgenus Ocnogynodes
Logunovium
Madagascarctia
Maurica
Menegites
Metacrias
Micralarctia
Micraloa
Monstruncusarctia
Murzinarctia
Murzinoria
Murzinowatsonia
Nannoarctia with a subgenus Pseudorajendra
Nebrarctia
Nicetosoma
Ocnogyna
Olepa
Orhantarctia
Pangora
Paralacydes
Paralpenus
Paramaenas
Paramsacta
Paraspilarctia with a subgenus Kishidarctia
Pericaliella
Phaos
Phlyctaenogastra
Phragmatobia
Poecilarctia
Popoudina with a subgenus Pseudopopoudina
Pseudophragmatobia
Pseudoradiarctia
Pyrrharctia
Radiarctia
Rajendra
Rhagonis - often included in Spilosoma
Rhodareas: probably a subgenus of Spilarctia
Rhodogastria
Saenura
Satara with a subgenus Owadasatara
Seirarctia
Seydelia
Sinowatsonia
Somatrichia
Spilaethalida
Spilarctia - often included in Spilosoma
Spilosoma
Streltzovia
Tajigyna
Tatargina with a subgenus Hindargina
Teracotona with two subgenera Neoteracotona and Pseudoteracotona
Toulgarctia
Ustjuzhania
Watsonarctia

External links

 
Lepidoptera subtribes